Clara Young may refer to:
 Clara Whipple Young (1887–1932), American film actress
 Clara Kimball Young (1890–1960), American film actress
 Clara Young (Yiddish theater) (1882–1952), Yiddish theatrical actor